Calville was a community in Humboldt County, California, located  north of Arcata, at an elevation of 154 feet (47 m). It is centered on Sutter Road and Central Avenue, and became part of the large unincorporated community of McKinleyville.

References

Former settlements in Humboldt County, California